Rita De Bont (born 29 July 1954 in Vilvoorde, Belgium) is a Belgian politician of the Vlaams Belang (a party of the far right that advocates Flemish independence).  She was a member of the Chamber of Representatives from 2007 to 2014, representing Antwerp.

References

1954 births
Living people
People from Vilvoorde
Vlaams Belang politicians
Members of the Chamber of Representatives (Belgium)
21st-century Belgian politicians
21st-century Belgian women politicians